Selseleh-ye Safīd Kūh is a mountain range in northwestern Afghanistan.

Selseleh-ye Safīd Kūh may also refer to:

 Spīn Ghar, a mountain range in eastern Afghanistan

See also
 Safēd Kōh (disambiguation)
 Sefid Kuh (disambiguation)